Ikechukwu Emmanuel Chima, also known as Emmyblaq cfr, is a Nigerian singer, comedian and hype man.

Background and education 
Emmyblaq was born to an Igbo family in Auchi, Edo state. He hails from Imo state. His parents have six children, and he is the third child. He had his primary, secondary, and tertiary education in Auchi; earning his National Diploma from Auchi Polytechnic. He attended a technical school in JSS2 for his secondary education, having brief stints as a generator repairer, a barber and a fashion stylist for a while.

Career 
Emmyblaq started his entertainment career as a content creator; releasing skits in collaboration with friends. After his first hype gig for Valchi bar in Auchi and the ensuing positive response that it garnered, he would switch to identifying as a hype man. He would later get signed by Feddy Empier Records, alongside DJ and move to work in Warri. He has worked in Edo State, Lagos State and Delta state.

He featured on Teni's song titled "Moslado (Refix)", on Waje's "Lover", on the "Joor", volume 1 and 2 mixtapes by DJ Kaywise and on DJ Phantom's "Motivation and Vibes" mix.

He was acknowledged by The Nation, as being one of the Nigerian entertainment trendsetters of 2021. And also by NotJustOk as being amongst the leading hype men of the Nigerian entertainment industry.

He is an advocate for more recognition to be allotted to hype men in the industry, emphasizing that hype men have the potential to win awards and get international collaborations for the art they bring into the entertainment industry. In an interview with Vanguard, he iterated the influence of hype men on brands and their ability to draw awareness and ultimately grow a particular brand's reach.

Following the passing of DJ Flexy, a different hype man who had died by poisoning. It was wrongly reported by some section of the media that it was Emmyblaq who had died. He cane out to clear the air, confirming that he was alive, releasing an original version of the hype phrase on Instagram and publicly had to claim ownership of the song "5 bottles of Hennessy VSOP" featuring DJ Nice, which contained the slogan "One for the DJ, one for the hype man" which was the cause of the confusion at the time, regarding it's proprietary status.

Discography

2021 
 New Age Vibe featuring EnizTheDJ
 Baby Material
 Wife Material (You Get Nyash)
 Talking Drum (Freestyle)
 Na Your Papa Money
 Who Break Up
 Olosho
 Back Up
 Breakfast
 Need Somebody

2022 
 Kick Poverty
 Wayward Vibes featuring DJ Samplex (Live)
 Baller’s Alert
 Cannot See
 Full Spec 
 Champion

As Featured Artiste 

 Moslado Refix by (Teni)
 Lover by (Waje)
 Joor , Vol. 1 & 2 by (DJ Kaywise)
 Motivation and Vibes by (DJ Phantom)
 Phantom Cruise and Chill by (DJ Phantom)
 The Hype Monster Lyrics and Vibes, Vol 2 (5 Bottles Of Hennessy VSOP) by (DJ Nice & ID Klef)
 The Matter by (Desbeatz)

References 

Year of birth unknown
Living people
 People from Imo State
 Igbo people
 People from Auchi
 People from Edo State
Nigerian entertainers
Nigerian male actors
21st-century Nigerian male actors
Nigerian musicians
 Nigerian comedians
Year of birth missing (living people)